Respiratory failure results from inadequate gas exchange by the respiratory system, meaning that the arterial oxygen, carbon dioxide, or both cannot be kept at normal levels. A drop in the oxygen carried in the blood is known as hypoxemia; a rise in arterial carbon dioxide levels is called hypercapnia. Respiratory failure is classified as either Type 1 or Type 2, based on whether there is a high carbon dioxide level, and can be acute or chronic. In clinical trials, the definition of respiratory failure usually includes increased respiratory rate, abnormal blood gases (hypoxemia, hypercapnia, or both), and evidence of increased work of breathing. Respiratory failure causes an altered mental status due to ischemia in the brain.

The typical partial pressure reference values are oxygen Pa  more than 80 mmHg (11 kPa) and carbon dioxide Pa  less than 45 mmHg (6.0 kPa).

Cause

Several types of conditions can potentially result in respiratory failure:
 Conditions that reduce the flow of air into and out of the lungs, including physical obstruction by foreign bodies or masses and reduced breathing due to drugs or changes to the chest.
Conditions that impair the lungs' blood supply. These include thromboembolic conditions and conditions that reduce the output of the right heart, such as right heart failure and some myocardial infarctions.
 Conditions that limit the ability of the lung tissue to exchange oxygen and carbon dioxide between the blood and the air within the lungs. Any disease which can damage the lung tissue can fit into this category. The most common causes are (in no particular order) infections, interstitial lung disease, and pulmonary oedema.

Diagnosis

Type 1
Type 1 respiratory failure is defined as a low level of oxygen in the blood (hypoxemia) with either a standard (normocapnia) or low (hypocapnia) level of carbon dioxide (PaCO2) but not an increased level (hypercapnia). It is typically caused by a ventilation/perfusion (V/Q) mismatch; the volume of air flowing in and out of the lungs is not matched with the flow of blood to the lungs. The fundamental defect in type 1 respiratory failure is a failure of oxygenation characterized by:

{| class="wikitable"
|PaO2 || decreased (< )
|-
| PaCO2 || normal or decreased (<)
|-
| PA-aO2 || increased
|}

This type of respiratory failure is caused by conditions that affect oxygenation, such as:

 Low ambient oxygen (e.g. at high altitude)
 Ventilation-perfusion mismatch (parts of the lung receive oxygen but not enough blood to absorb it, e.g. pulmonary embolism)
 Alveolar hypoventilation (decreased minute volume due to reduced respiratory muscle activity, e.g. in acute neuromuscular disease); this form can also cause type 2 respiratory failure if severe.
 Diffusion problem (oxygen cannot enter the capillaries due to parenchymal disease, e.g. in pneumonia or ARDS)
 Shunt (oxygenated blood mixes with non-oxygenated blood from the venous system, e.g. right to left shunt)

Type 2
Hypoxemia (PaO2 <8kPa or normal) with hypercapnia (PaCO2 >6.0kPa).

The basic defect in type 2 respiratory failure is characterized by:

{| class="wikitable"
|PaO2 || decreased (< )or normal
|-
| PaCO2 || increased (> )
|-
| PA-aO2 || normal
|-
|pH || <7.35
|}

Type 2 respiratory failure is caused by inadequate alveolar ventilation; both oxygen and carbon dioxide are affected.  Defined as the buildup of carbon dioxide levels (PaCO2) that has been generated by the body but cannot be eliminated. The underlying causes include:
 Increased airways resistance (chronic obstructive pulmonary disease, asthma, suffocation)
 Reduced breathing effort (drug effects, brain stem lesion, extreme obesity)
 A decrease in the area of the lung available for gas exchange (such as in chronic bronchitis)
 Neuromuscular problems (Guillain–Barré syndrome, motor neuron disease)
 Deformed (kyphoscoliosis), rigid (ankylosing spondylitis), or flail chest.

Type 3
Type 3 respiratory failure results from lung atelectasis. Because atelectasis occurs so commonly in the perioperative period, this form is also called  perioperative respiratory failure.  After general anesthesia, decreases in functional residual capacity  leads to  collapse  of  dependent lung units.

Type 4
Type 4 respiratory failure results from hypoperfusion of respiratory muscles as in patients in shock. Patients in shock often experience respiratory distress due to pulmonary edema (e.g., in cardiogenic shock). Lactic acidosis and anemia can also result in type 4 respiratory failure. However, type 1 and 2 are the most widely accepted.

Treatment

Treatment of the underlying cause is required, if possible. The treatment of acute respiratory failure may involve medication such as bronchodilators (for airways disease), antibiotics (for infections), glucocorticoids (for numerous causes), diuretics (for pulmonary oedema), amongst others. Respiratory failure resulting from an overdose of opioids may be treated with the antidote naloxone. In contrast, most benzodiazepine overdose does not benefit from its antidote, flumazenil. Respiratory therapy/respiratory physiotherapy may be beneficial in some cases of respiratory failure.

Type 1 respiratory failure may require oxygen therapy to achieve adequate oxygen saturation. Lack of oxygen response may indicate other modalities such as heated humidified high-flow therapy, continuous positive airway pressure or (if severe) endotracheal intubation and mechanical ventilation. .

Type 2 respiratory failure often requires non-invasive ventilation (NIV) unless medical therapy can improve the situation. Mechanical ventilation is sometimes indicated immediately or otherwise if NIV fails. Respiratory stimulants such as doxapram are now rarely used.

There is tentative evidence that in those with respiratory failure identified before arrival in hospital, continuous positive airway pressure can be helpful when started before conveying to hospital.

See also 
 Ventilation/perfusion ratio
 Pulmonary shunt

References

External links 
 MedlinePlus: Respiratory Failure

Intensive care medicine
Medical emergencies
Organ failure
Respiratory diseases
Causes of death